Paraguay competed at the 1972 Summer Olympics in Munich, West Germany. Three competitors, all men, took part in three events in two sports.

Athletics

Key
Note–Ranks given for track events are within the athlete's heat only
Q = Qualified for the next round
q = Qualified for the next round as a fastest loser or, in field events, by position without achieving the qualifying target
NR = National record
N/A = Round not applicable for the event
Bye = Athlete not required to compete in round

Men
Track & road events

Shooting

One male shooter represented Paraguay in 1972.

See also
Paraguay at the 1971 Pan American Games

References

External links
Official Olympic Reports

Nations at the 1972 Summer Olympics
1972
Olympics